The Malagasy dwarf gecko (Lygodactylus klemmeri), also known commonly as Klemmer's dwarf gecko, is a species of gecko, a lizard in the family Gekkonidae.

Geographic range
L. klemmeri is endemic to Madagascar.

Etymology
The specific name, klemmeri, is in honor of German herpetologist Konrad Klemmer.

Habitat
The preferred natural habitat of L. klemmeri is forest.

Behavior
L. klemmeri is arboreal.

Reproduction
L. klemmeri is oviparous.

References

Further reading
Glaw F, Vences M (2006). A Field Guide to Amphibians and Reptiles of Madagascar, Third Edition. Cologne, Germany: Vences & Glaw Verlag. 496 pp. .
Pasteur G (1965). "Notes préliminaires sur les lygodactyles (gekkonidés). IV. Diagnoses de quelques formes africaines et malgaches ". Bulletin du Museum National d'Histoire Naturelle, Paris 36: 311–314. (Lygodactylus klemmeri, new species). (in French).
Pasteur G (1995). "Biodiversité et reptiles: diagnoses de sept nouvelles espèces fossiles et actuelles du genre de lézards Lygodactylus (Sauria, Gekkonidae) ". Dumerilia 2: 1-21. (Lygodactylus praecox, new species). (in French).

Lygodactylus
Reptiles described in 1965
Reptiles of Madagascar
Endemic fauna of Madagascar